The Faith and Values Coalition is an American political action committee composed of evangelical supporters, mostly from the Republican Party. Created by Jerry Falwell in November 2004, its birth was in large part fueled by the results of the 2004 Presidential Election, where exit-polling indicated that an estimated 21% of voters focused mainly on moral values as the central issue when deciding which candidate to choose.

Political advocacy groups in the United States
Jerry Falwell